Corporate video refers to any type of non-advertisement based video content created for and commissioned by a business, company, corporation, or organization. Today, the vast majority of corporate video content is hosted online and is published on the company’s website page and distributed through social media or email marketing. 

Corporate video content is targeted towards that company’s core selling demographics or internal employees. Corporate video production is frequently the responsibility of a marketing director or corporate communications manager. Examples of corporate video include corporate overview videos, staff training and safety videos, promotional/brand films, investor relations and shareholder videos, market updates, product videos, event videos, onboarding videos, employer branding videos, CEO statements, executive proposal videos, and customer testimonial videos.

As video becomes a more integral part of a company’s communication strategy, often companies will release corporate videos with press release announcements, newsletters and other forms of communication to bolster the message reach and effectiveness.

Corporate Video Production companies leverage a company’s marketing material, guidance from their communication director, and content specific copy to produce a corporate video. The time and scale of a corporate video production can vary greatly based on complexity and messaging. Some corporate videos may use only minimal crew and basic equipment, while others elect for higher quality content and contract with corporate video production specialists whose core focus is on creating B2B corporate video content.

Video content has become a significant ranking factor for search engine optimization from search engines such as Google, Yahoo and Bing and as a result more companies are electing to create corporate video content for their websites.

Stages of Production
The corporate video production process will frequently involve the following stages:
Project initiation, budgeting and creation of statement of work.
 Pre-production - planning may include script writing, storyboarding, casting, location scouting, and scheduling.
 Video production, including location filming with a camera crew and director. This may also include other elements, such as actors and presenters.
 Post-production and video editing - the filmed (live action) footage is edited together. This may also include recording an audio voice-over, adding graphics, composing a music score or soundtrack, and including 2D/3D animation sequences with the finished video.
Final delivery and website integration.

Types and usage
 Staff training / instruction and safety videos
 Employer Branding Videos
 Onboarding Videos
 CEO statements
 Event Videos
 Investor relations / financial results
 Company promotional/brand videos
 New product or service online presentations
Product features and benefits explainer video 
 Video role play (often with actors)
 Client and customer testimonial videos
 Event Videos
Trade show coverage
 Corporate event filming (for example, a new product launch or conference)
 Live and on-demand webcasting
 Technology and product demonstration videos
 Business television

See also
 List of video topics
 Filmmaking
 Video Production
 Television
 Video production companies
 Corporate communications
 Marketing

References

External links
 Association of Professional Videomakers - A not-for-profit UK trade association for professionals in the video industry
 Institute of Videography - UK trade association offering advice on wedding and corporate video production
 The IVCA is a European professional body which promotes best practice for the corporate and public sector communications industry.

Video

Корпоративное телевидение